The 2022 World Rally-Raid Championship was the inaugural season of the annual competition for rally raid events sanctioned by both the FIA and FIM.

Calendar
The calendar for the 2022 season originally featured five rally-raid events. Rally Kazakhstan, which was initially planned for 24–30 April, was cancelled due to the Russian invasion of Ukraine. The Andalucía Rally was moved from its original 6–12 June date to October due to a heat wave and wildfire risk in the region, and the Rallye du Maroc was pushed forward by five days to accommodate the change.

World Championship results

T1

Entry list

Results

FIA Rally-Raid World Championship for Drivers, Co-Drivers, and Manufacturers
Points system
Competitors have to be registered to score points. 
 Points for final positions in rally events are awarded as per the following table:

 Points for final positions in marathon events are awarded as per the following table:

Drivers' & Co-Drivers' championships

Manufacturer's championship
Points system
A registered manufacturer is allowed to enter a maximum of three crews in each event. Only the top two from each manufacturer will count towards their score. Points are awarded on the same scales as set out for drivers/co-drivers.

T3

Entry list

Results

FIA Rally-Raid Championship for T3 Drivers and Co-Drivers
Points system
Competitors have to be registered to score points. 
 Points for final positions in rally events are awarded as per the following table:

 Points for final positions in marathon events are awarded as per the following table:

Drivers' & Co-Drivers' championships

T4

Entry list

Results

FIA Rally-Raid Championship for T4 Drivers and Co-Drivers
Points system
Competitors have to be registered to score points. 
 Points for final positions in rally events are awarded as per the following table:

 Points for final positions in marathon events are awarded as per the following table:

Drivers' & Co-Drivers' championships

T5

Entry list

Results

FIA Rally-Raid Championship for T5 Drivers and Co-Drivers
Points system
Competitors have to be registered to score points. 
 Points for final positions in rally events are awarded as per the following table:

 Points for final positions in marathon events are awarded as per the following table:

Drivers' & Co-Drivers' championships

RallyGP

Entry list

Results

FIM Rally-Raid World Championship for Riders and Manufacturers
Points system
 A rider has to be registered to score points
 Points for final positions in rally events are awarded as per the following table:

 A coefficient of 1.5 will be applied to marathon events. The result will be rounded up to the nearest integer.

Rider's championship

Manufacturer's championship
Points system
 Points are awarded to the top-two finishing entries for each manufacturer.

Rally2

Entry list

Results

FIM Rally-Raid World Cup for Rally2 Riders
Points system
 Points for final positions in rally events are awarded as per the following table:

 A coefficient of 1.5 will be applied to marathon events. The result will be rounded up to the nearest integer.

Rider's championship

FIM Junior trophy

FIM Women's trophy

FIM Veteran's trophy

Quad

Entry list

Results

FIM Rally-Raid World Cup for Quad Riders
Points system
 Points for final positions in rally events are awarded as per the following table:

 A coefficient of 1.5 will be applied to marathon events. The result will be rounded up to the nearest integer.

Rider's championship

Rally3

Results

Rider's championship

References

External links
 

World Rally-Raid Championship

World Rally-Raid Championship